Mangala Fossa is a graben in the Memnonia quadrangle of Mars, located near , which originated in the Hesperian and Amazonian epochs. The graben is located at the head of the outflow channel Mangala Valles, which is thought to have been formed by at least two catastrophic flood events during the same geological period, leading to the release of vast quantities of water from Mangala Fossa onto the Martian surface. The flooding was probably initiated by the emplacement of a dike radiating from the volcano Arsia Mons, resulting in the formation of the graben, Mangala Fossa, at the channels' head. This dike breached a pressurized aquifer trapped beneath a thick "cryosphere" (layer of frozen ground) beneath the surface. As the floor of the graben subsided, water found its way up one or both of the faults in the crust that defined the edges of the graben and spilled into the depression, eventually filling it and overflowing at the lowest point on the rim to erode the Mangala Valles channels.

"Mangala" is the name for Mars in Jyotish (or Hindu) astrology.

Gallery

See also

 Outburst flood
 Outflow channels

Further reading
 Leask, H. J., L. Wilson, and K. L. Mitchell (2006), Formation of Ravi Vallis outflow channel, Mars: Morphological development, water discharge, and duration estimates, J. Geophys. Res., 111, E08070, doi:10.1029/2005JE002550.
 Wilson, L.; Head, J.W.; Leask, H.J.; Ghatan, G.; Mitchell, K.L. (2004), Factors Controlling Water Volumes and Release Rates in Martian Outflow Channels, Lunar and Planetary Science XXXV (2004).

References

External links
 Lunar and Planetary Institute

Valleys and canyons on Mars
Memnonia quadrangle